Niclas Thiede (born 14 April 1999) is a German professional footballer who plays as a goalkeeper for 3. Liga club SC Verl.

Club career
Thiede made his professional debut for SC Freiburg in the Bundesliga on 19 October 2019, coming on as a substitute for the injured Alexander Schwolow in the away match against Union Berlin.

On 27 June 2022, Thiede moved to SC Verl on a permanent basis.

References

External links
 
 
 

1999 births
Living people
Sportspeople from Hagen
Footballers from North Rhine-Westphalia
German footballers
Germany youth international footballers
Association football goalkeepers
SC Freiburg II players
SC Freiburg players
SC Verl players
Bundesliga players
3. Liga players
Regionalliga players